Painting with a Twist is the largest company in the paint and sip industry, with headquarters in Mandeville, Louisiana. Founded in 2007, Painting with a Twist offers live painting events accompanied by wine or cocktails with in its studio locations. Events are held in local studios owned and operated by independent franchisees. Studio artists guide guests step-by-step as they create a personalized painting. Events typically last two hours and guests take home their artwork. All art supplies are provided.

They have many studio locations nationwide.

History
Painting with a Twist was founded by Cathy Deano and Renee Maloney in 2007. Initially, the business was named Corks N Canvas, but after opening their fourth store in the New Orleans, Louisiana area, decided to franchise the concept in 2009.
 
Cathy Deano and Renee Maloney started Painting with a Twist as a way to bring business back to their community after Hurricane Katrina.

Publicity
In 2017, Renee Maloney and Painting with a Twist was featured in Season 8 episode 4  of Undercover Boss (U.S. TV series).

References

Franchises
Paint and sip companies